The 2018 German Darts Grand Prix was the second of thirteen PDC European Tour events on the 2018 PDC Pro Tour. The tournament took place at Kulturhalle Zenith, Munich, Germany, between 31 March–2 April 2018. It featured a field of 48 players and £135,000 in prize money, with £25,000 going to the winner.

Michael van Gerwen was the defending champion, after defeating Rob Cross 6–3 in the final of the 2017 tournament, and he retained his title by defeating Peter Wright 8–5 in the final.

Prize money
This is how the prize money is divided:

Prize money will count towards the PDC Order of Merit, the ProTour Order of Merit and the European Tour Order of Merit, with one exception: should a seeded player lose in the second round (last 32), their prize money will not count towards any Orders of Merit, although they still receive the full prize money payment.

Qualification and format 
The top 16 entrants from the PDC ProTour Order of Merit on 6 February will automatically qualify for the event and will be seeded in the second round.

The remaining 32 places will go to players from five qualifying events – 18 from the UK Qualifier (held in Barnsley on 16 February), eight from the West/South European Qualifier (held on 22 March), four from the Host Nation Qualifier (held on 30 March), one from the Nordic & Baltic Qualifier (held on 26 January) and one from the East European Qualifier (held on 27 January).

The following players will take part in the tournament:

Top 16
  Michael van Gerwen (champion)
  Peter Wright (runner-up)
  Michael Smith (third round)
  Rob Cross (quarter-finals)
  Daryl Gurney (semi-finals)
  Mensur Suljović (third round)
  Joe Cullen (quarter-finals)
  Simon Whitlock (second round)
  Dave Chisnall (second round)
  Kim Huybrechts (second round)
  Mervyn King (second round)
  Ian White (third round)
  Gerwyn Price (second round)
  Jelle Klaasen (second round)
  Kyle Anderson (second round)
  Alan Norris (third round)

UK Qualifier
  Darren Webster (third round)
  Nathan Aspinall (first round)
  Stephen Bunting (second round)
  Paul Rowley (first round)
  Jonny Clayton (second round)
  James Wade (semi-finals)
  Josh Payne (second round)
  Adrian Lewis (first round)
  James Wilson (first round)
  Alan Tabern (third round)
  Scott Taylor (first round)
  Steve West (third round)
  Keegan Brown (quarter-finals)
  Luke Humphries (third round)
  William O'Connor (first round)
  Steve Lennon (second round)
  Chris Dobey (second round)
  Ryan Meikle (second round)

West/South European Qualifier
  Jermaine Wattimena (first round)
  Toni Alcinas (second round)
  Danny Noppert (second round)
  Christian Gödl (first round)
  Rowby-John Rodriguez (first round)
  Yordi Meeuwisse (second round)
  Michael Rasztovits (first round)
  Jan Dekker (first round)

Host Nation Qualifier
  René Berndt (first round)
  Max Hopp (quarter-finals)
  Martin Schindler (first round)
  Maik Langendorf (first round)

Nordic & Baltic Qualifier
  Madars Razma (first round) 

East European Qualifier
  Krzysztof Ratajski (first round)

Draw

References 

2018 PDC European Tour
2018 in German sport
Sports competitions in Munich
March 2018 sports events in Germany
April 2018 sports events in Germany